is a town located in Nishisonogi District, Nagasaki Prefecture, Japan.

Geography 
Nagayo is located within the southern part of Nagasaki prefecture and resides at the south of Ōmura Bay.

Neighbouring municipalities 

 Nagasaki
 Isahaya
 Togitsu

History 
In the Edo period of the late 18th century, Nagayo ware became established and produced until the end of the 19th century.

Demographics 
As of March 1, 2017, the town has an estimated population of 42,570 and a density of 1,500 persons per km². The total area is 28.81 km².

Sister city 
Nagayo have a sister city relationship with the town of Wethersfield from Connecticut since 1999.

Transportation

Railway 

 JR Kyushu - Nagasaki Main Line (Branch Line)
 Honkawachi - Nagayo - Kōda - Michinoo

Highway 

 Japan National Route 207

Gallery

External links

 
 Nagayo official website 

Towns in Nagasaki Prefecture